Morum teramachii is a species of sea snail, a marine gastropod mollusk in the family Harpidae, the harp snails.

Description

Distribution

References

 Emerson W.K. (1990). New records for western Pacific Morum (Gastropoda: Harpidae) with biogeographic implications. The Veliger. 33(2): 145–154

Harpidae